Erik Tandberg (October 19, 1932 – May 2, 2020) was a Norwegian engineer, author, television personality and space educator. He was born in Oslo, Norway. He was a master of science from Stanford University in 1959. He did his scholarship at Princeton University in the years 1964-65.

He became technical consultant on space matters at NRK from 1960.
From that time, he wrote several books and publications on space related subjects.
He was a TV commentator at NRK on all Apollo program moon landings 1969-72, together with Jan P. Jansen.
In the decades thereafter, Tandberg was by far the most widely shown space expert on Norwegian television, at the same time doing a lot of public lectures on the subject.

He was connected to Norwegian Space Centre.

Tandberg was a member of the City Council of Oslo for the Conservative Party from 1969-89.

He died on May 2, 2020.

References 

1932 births
2020 deaths
Norwegian science writers